Liam Langton (born 1997) is an Irish hurler who plays for Offaly Championship club Clodiagh Gaels and at inter-county level with the Offaly senior hurling team. He usually lines out as a forward.

Career

Born in Killeigh, County Offaly, Lanton first came to hurling prominence with the Clodiagh Gaels team that won the County Intermediate Championship title in 2016. He first appeared on the inter-county scene with the Offaly minor team during the 2015 Leinster Minor Championship before a three-year stint with the under-21 team. Langton made his debut with the Offaly senior hurling team during the 2016 National Hurling League.

Honours

Clodiagh Gaels
Offaly Intermediate Hurling Championship: 2016

Offaly
Christy Ring Cup: 2021
National Hurling League Division 2A: 2021

References

1997 births
Living people
Clodiagh Gaels hurlers
Offaly inter-county hurlers